Attempted killing can refer to:

 Suicide attempt
 Assassination attempt